Beosus is a genus of dirt-colored seed bugs in the family Rhyparochromidae. There are at least four described species in Beosus.

Species
These four species belong to the genus Beosus:
 Beosus flexuosus Montrouzier, 1865
 Beosus laevicollis Montrouzier, 1865
 Beosus maritimus (Scopoli, 1763)
 Beosus quadripunctatus (Muller, 1766)

References

External links

 

Rhyparochromidae